Nancy Nevinson (26 July 1918 – 25 January 2012) was a British actress. She was born Nancy Ezekiel, one of four children of Reemah (née Kadoorie) and David Ezekiel, members of the Baghdadi-Jewish community of Calcutta, India, during the Raj. The family moved to London in the 1930s, where Nancy trained at RADA and took the stage name Nancy Nevinson, which she retained after her subsequent marriage to Commander William Hoyes-Cock.

Early life
Nevinson was born in Chittagong, East Bengal, British India.

Career
Nevison worked on stage, in film and on television. She also dubbed voices for both young and old. She appeared in the films Foxhole in Cairo (1960), Light in the Piazza (1962), Mrs. Gibbons' Boys (1962), Ring of Spies (1964), The Spy Who Came in from the Cold (1965), For the Love of Ada (1972), Symptoms (1974), Jesus of Nazareth (1977), S.O.S. Titanic (1979), Le Pétomane (1979), Raise the Titanic (1980), Young Sherlock Holmes (1985), and Mrs Dalloway (1997).

Family
Nevinson married Commander William Hoyes-Cock (1905-1973), whom she met while touring with the Entertainments National Service Association (ENSA) during WW2. They had three children: Nigel Nevinson, Jennifer (Gennie) Nevinson, and Hugh Hoyes-Cock. Nigel and Gennie are both actors.

Retirement
In 2001, she moved to Wokingham, to a retirement home funded by the Cinema and Television Benevolent Fund especially for film and television personalities. Nevinson died there on 25 January 2012, aged 93.

Filmography

1956: Othello – Emilia (English version, voice)
1956: High Flight – Bishop's Wife
1957-1959: The Adventures of Twizzle – Twizzle / Narrator (voices)
1958: Wonderful Things! – Mother
1958: Starr and Company (TV Series) – Megs Turner
1960: Night Train for Inverness – Landlady (uncredited)
1961: Foxhole in Cairo – Signorina Signorelli
1961: Very Important Person – German wife (uncredited)
1961: Das Geheimnis der gelben Narzissen – Sluttish woman (uncredited)
1962: Light in the Piazza – Signora Naccarelli
1962: Mrs. Gibbons' Boys – Mrs. Morelli
1963: Ricochet – Elsie Siddall
1963: Ring of Spies – Helen Kroger
1964: Smuggler's Bay (TV series) –  Mrs. Belmore
1965: The Big Spender (TV Series) – Mrs. Winters
1965: The Spy Who Came in from the Cold – Mrs. Zanfrello (uncredited)
1966: The Scales of Justice ('Infamous Conduct' episode)
1967: An Officer of the Court (TV Series) – Rachel
1970: Love Is a Splendid Illusion – Amanda's Mother
1972: Our Miss Fred – Patron's Wife
1972: For the Love of Ada – Elsie Lockwood
1974: Symptoms – Hannah
1977: Jesus of Nazareth (TV Mini-Series) – Abigail
1977: Gulliver's Travels – (voice)
1979: S.O.S. Titanic (TV Movie) – Ida Strauss
1980: Raise the Titanic – Sarah Martindale
1981: Private Schulz (TV Series) – Frau Ehrlich
1982: Jane (TV Series) – Colonels Wife
1985: Young Sherlock Holmes – Hotel Receptionist
1988: War and Remembrance (TV Mini-Series) – Woman at Weir Courteney
1994: Martin Chuzzlewit (TV Mini-Series) – Deaf Cousin
1997: Mrs. Dalloway – Mrs. Hilberry

References

External links

 Obituary – Times (The obituary has been archived. The word actress is not mentioned in the obituary, but Glebelands has only 41 residents – see History on glebelands.org. Two 93-year-old Nancy Nevinsons is hardly likely.)
Obituary – Times (cached)
 

1918 births
2012 deaths
Alumni of RADA
British people in colonial India
English film actresses
English stage actresses
English television actresses
20th-century English actresses